(born , 20 February 1950 – 29 March 2020) was a Japanese comedian. He co-starred with Masashi Tashiro, Nobuyoshi Kuwano in the Japanese variety show .

Throughout his comedy career, Shimura was known for his "Bakatono-sama" character, which was unusual among Japanese comedians, in that he could satirize the deeds of powerful figures (a company president, a politician, a family head, a school principal, the head of a Japanese yakuza gang) under the garb of a foolish king who lived in the country a long time ago. Another popular routine of Shimura in the same show was "Henna Oji-san" [weird/dirty old man] who entertained himself in the company of nubile girls. After being caught for his pranks, the character regularly ended the routine with a song Sou desu. Watashi ga Henna Oji-san desu. ("That is correct. I am Henna Oji-san.") He was also known for his nonsense catchphrase "Daffunda" which would often end a Henna Oji-san skit.

Shimura's comedic work was inspired in part by that of Jerry Lewis.

Career 

Shimura became known in 1974, replacing Chu Arai in the famous comedy group The Drifters. With the help of the other members of the group, he learned to act and make the audience laugh. Over time, he showed a knack for comedy. Some memorable pictures of that time are the mustache dance, in which he starred with Cha Katō and the song Higashimurayama, referring to his homeland.

With this group,  he participated in the weekly program Hachiji Dayo! Zen'inshugo! from 1974 to 1985, reaching 40% to 50% of viewers at their best. From 1977, he also participated in the television program Dorifu Daibakusho ("Dorifu, big burst of laughter"), which were special sketches, totaling one and a half hours. It is currently possible to see members together only on television specials.

The rapport Shimura had with Cha Katō, also a member of Higashimurayama, kept them together on television. In 1986, they created the  Kato-chan Ken-chan Gokigen Terebi, which aired until 1992. In The Detective Story, they are two detective friends who get into a lot of trouble. The high ratings allowed for high-cost scenes with exploding cars, helicopters and crowds. A famous painting of this time is Shimura as a monk, who asked people to repeat the words "Daijoubuda, ... ueh, ueh, ueh", whereas "daijoubuda" literally means "I'm all right."

This program ran about three times a year since 1986. In it, Shimura is a feudal lord ("tono") who does not want to rule and only thinks about having fun. The character was created at the time of Hachiji Dayo! Zen'inshugo! and is characterized by an all-white face, extremely thick eyebrows and hair tied at the top of the head. The program always featured celebrity stakes.

His show, Ken Shimura Daijoubuda, a satire of modern Japanese society, aired from 1987 to 1993.

Post-Daijoubuda
Following up his previous big hits, Shimura led several shows, mostly on the Fuji TV network. From 1996, he began working with newbie Yuuka. Shimura's participation in the career of humorists (such as Katsuhiro Higo and Ryuuhei Ueshima, and Haruna Kondou and Haruka Minowa) and other celebrities is notorious.

1993–1995: Shimura Ken wa Ikagadeshou ("How about a Ken Shimura") – with Masashi Tashiro, Yoko Ishino, Nobuyoshi Kuwano, Minayo Watanabe, etc.
1995–1996: Shimura Ken no Ore ga Nani Shitano yo ("Ken Shimura's What the Hell Did I do?") – with Masashi Tashiro, Nobuyoshi Kuwano, Minayo Watanabe, etc.
1996–1997: Shimura X – with Maiko Kawakami, Yukiko Someya, Kazumi Murata, Yuuka, Housei Yamasaki and Ryuuhei Ueshima.
1997–1998: Shimura XYZ – with Maiko Kawakami, Yukiko Someya, Kazumi Murata, Yuuka, Housei Yamasaki and Ryuuhei Ueshima.
1998–2000: Shimura X-Tengoku ("Shimura Paradise X") – with Maiko Kawakami, Yukiko Someya, Kazumi Murata, Yuuka, Housei Yamasaki and Ryuuhei Ueshima.
2000–2002: Henna Ojisan TV ("Strange Uncle's TV") – with Yuuka, Katsuhiro Higo, Ryuuhei Ueshima, Masanori Ishii and Yoshiyuki Ishizuka.
2002–2004: Shimura Ryuu ("Shimura's Style") – with Yuuka, Katsuhiro Higo, Ryuuhei Ueshima, Masanori Ishii, Yoshiyuki Ishizuka, Chizuru Yamada and Ayumi Kato.
2004: Shimura Juku ("Shimura's Class") – with Yuuka, Katsuhiro Higo, Ryuuhei Ueshima, Masanori Ishii, Yoshiyuki Ishizuka, Chizuru Yamada, Ayumi Kato, etc.
2004–2005: Shimura Tsuu ("Shimura, a tasteful person") – with Yuuka, Katsuhiro Higo, Ryuuhei Ueshima, Jun Natsukawa, Chizuru Yamada, etc.
2005–2008: Shimura Ken no Daijoubuda II ("Ken Shimura's I'm All Right II") – with Yuuka, Katsuhiro Higo, Ryuuhei Ueshima, Wakako Shimazaki, Jun Natsukawa and Chen Qu.
2004–2020: Tensai! Shimura Dōbutsuen ("Genius! Shimura Zoo") – with chimpanzee Pankun and his son.
2008–2020: Shimura Ya Desu ("It's Shimura's Store") – with Yuuka, Katsuhiro Higo, Ryuuhei Ueshima, Haruna Kondou, Haruka Minowa, Emi Kobayashi and Erika Yazawa.

In 2006, he formed and led his own comedy theater, Shimurakon (Shimura Spirit).

Tensai! Shimura Dōbutsuen continued airing after Shimura's death, with on air remembrances of his time with the animals. On July 4, 2020, it was reported that Nippon TV had decided to end the broadcast, citing that it would be painfully difficult and heartbreaking to continue filming in a set filled with memories, that was destined for Shimura's advice. The last broadcast was set for September.

Illness and death 
Shimura was hospitalized for severe pneumonia on 20 March 2020; he lost consciousness after being anesthetized and hooked up to a ventilator on the following day. Then, on 23 March it was confirmed that he had COVID-19. He was the first Japanese tarento to have his COVID-19 diagnosis made public during the COVID-19 pandemic in Japan.

On 24 March, Shimura was transferred to a hospital where ECMO was available. He had been scheduled to star in the film , but his participation was cancelled on 26 March. He was also slated to carry the Olympic torch through part of Tokyo prior to the 2020 Tokyo games.

He was 70 years old.

Filmography 
Poppoya (1999), Hajime Yoshioka
The Lorax (2012), The Lorax (Japanese dub voice)
Yo-kai Watch: The Movie (2014), Master Nyada (voice)
Yell (2020, TV series), Kōzō Oyamada

Discography

As featured artist

See also
 Statue of Ken Shimura

References

External links 
 Ken Shimura's Official Blog 
 Ken Shimura. IMDb

1950 births
2020 deaths
Japanese male comedians
Comedians from Tokyo
People from Higashimurayama, Tokyo
Japanese racehorse owners and breeders
Deaths from the COVID-19 pandemic in Japan